Lesbian, gay, bisexual, and transgender (LGBT) rights are liberal in Rio de Janeiro. Same-sex marriage is legal in the state.

Recognition of same-sex unions

On 17 April 2013, The General Magistrate of Justice of Rio de Janeiro, Judge Valmir de Oliveira Silva, published a legal ruling authorizing same-sex marriage in the state if local judges agree. Same sex weddings are poised to begin in the coming days. According to the ruling (25/2013), a couples' request must be registered by civil registry officers, who have to give 15 days for the district to decide if they agree. If they don't agree, the marriage cannot proceed.

LGBT adoption
 August 24, 2007 - the Justice of the city of Rio de Janeiro authorized the adoption of a child by a lesbian couple.
 May 21, 2009 - the Justice of the city of Rio de Janeiro authorized the adoption of two children by a lesbian couple.
 February 22, 2010 - the Justice of the city of Rio de Janeiro, Rio de Janeiro authorized the adoption of a child by a lesbian couple.

References

Rio de Janeiro (state)
Rio de Janeiro (state)